Qazi Saleemul Huq (known as Quazi Kamal) is a Bangladesh Nationalist Party politician and a former Jatiya Sangsad member representing the Magura-2 constituency during 1994–1996 and 2001–2006. He is the founder of GQ Group of Industries, a manufacturing based organization in Bangladesh. He has been imprisoned since  February 2018 for a 10-year sentence in the Zia Charitable Trust corruption case.

Career
Kamal was elected in parliament from Magura-2 in the 1994 by-election as a candidate of Bangladesh Nationalist Party (BNP). In 2001 he was elected again from the same constituency. He was appointed as the president of Magura District unit of the party.

In January 2008, Kamal was acquitted from a case of abetting former state minister Salahuddin Ahmed in extorting money.

On 10 August 2016, Kamal resigned from the executive committee of BNP over the inclusion of Nitai Roy Chowdhury in the committee.

Kamal, along with the former Prime Minister Khaleda Zia, Tarique Rahman, Mominur Rahman, Kamal Uddin Siddique and  Sharfuddin Ahmed, were sentenced to imprisonment in the Zia Charitable Trust corruption case on 8 February 2018.

References

Living people
People from Magura District
Bangladesh Nationalist Party politicians
5th Jatiya Sangsad members
6th Jatiya Sangsad members
8th Jatiya Sangsad members
Bangladeshi politicians convicted of crimes
Bangladeshi prisoners and detainees
Year of birth missing (living people)
Place of birth missing (living people)
Bangladeshi male criminals
Prisoners and detainees of Bangladesh